Porunita is an inactive volcano in Chile.

The cone was constructed by andesite pyroclastic material and features a summit crater. The cone was formed 3.5 million years ago and has been degraded by erosion since then.

Sources 
 
 

Miocene volcanoes
Cinder cones of Chile